Stadio della neve was a temporary stadium located in Cortina d'Ampezzo, Italy. Located in the Campo di Sotto area, the venue hosted the cross-country skiing and the cross-country skiing part of the Nordic combined events for the 1956 Winter Olympics.

Post Olympics the stands and scoreboard was removed with the site now a grass field.

References
1956 Winter Olympics official report. pp. 155–63. 

Venues of the 1956 Winter Olympics
Olympic cross-country skiing venues
Olympic Nordic combined venues
Ski stadiums in Italy
Defunct sports venues in Italy